South Texas ISD World Scholars is one of STISD's four magnet high schools serving students in grades 9-12 from Cameron, Hidalgo & Willacy Counties, and is located in Edinburg, Texas. World Scholars is an International Baccalaureate (IB) Diploma Program campus, with over 50 courses to choose from. Students are not only eligible to graduate with an international diploma, but also eligible for free college/university credit opportunities + an associates degree.

External links
 

High schools in Hidalgo County, Texas
Public high schools in Texas
Education in Edinburg, Texas
Buildings and structures in Edinburg, Texas
South Texas Independent School District high schools